This is a list of the active National Football League teams' all-time win, loss, tie, and winning percentage records. The teams are listed by year each became active. Updated through Super Bowl LVI.

Notes